Spinout or Spin Out may refer to:

Corporate spin-off, also known as a spin-out, a type of corporate action where a company turns a portion of itself into a separate business
Spinout (driving), failure when braking

Entertainment
 Spinout (film), a 1966 film starring Elvis Presley
 Spinout (album), a 1966 album by Elvis Presley, a soundtrack to the movie Spinout
 "Spinout" (song), a 1966 song by Elvis Presley from the movie Spinout
 Spinout (video game), 2008
 Spin Out (film), a 2016 Australian film